Seeking Sister Wife is an American reality television show on TLC that follows polygamous families, predominantly centered around the topic of looking for another wife to add to the family, or an already added new wife adjusting to the family.

Cast

Weddings

Episodes

Season 1 (2018)

Season 2 (2019)

Season 3 (2021)

Season 4 (2022)

Abuse allegations
Christeline Petersen filed for a restraining order against Dimitri Snowden in March 2021 and alleged domestic abuse. Prior Snowden sister wife from before the show began, Ariadne Joseph, came forward and reported abuse as well. She alleged she told TLC this during season 1, and they did nothing.

See also
 Seeking Brother Husband, TLC's 2023 spin-off of Seeking Sister Wife
 Sister Wives, a reality TV show on TLC about a polygamist family
 My Five Wives, a reality TV show on TLC about a polygamist family
 Polyamory: Married & Dating, a reality TV show on Showtime about a polyamorous families
 Polygamy in North America

Notes

References

External links
 Seeking Sister Wife at TLC
 Seeking Sister Wife at IMDb

2010s American reality television series
American dating and relationship reality television series
Polygamy in the United States
Television series about polygamy
TLC (TV network) original programming